Sheila Hilary Hoskin (born 14 October 1936) is a former female track and field athlete from England.

Athletics career
Hoskin competed in the women's long jump events during her career.  She represented Great Britain at the 1956 Summer Olympics in Melbourne, Australia. She represented England and won a gold medal in the long jump at the 1958 British Empire and Commonwealth Games in Cardiff, Wales.

At one point Hoskin held the British record for the long jump.

She was born in Hammersmith.

References

1936 births
Living people
English female long jumpers
Athletes (track and field) at the 1956 Summer Olympics
Olympic athletes of Great Britain
British female long jumpers
Athletes (track and field) at the 1958 British Empire and Commonwealth Games
Commonwealth Games gold medallists for England
Commonwealth Games medallists in athletics
People from Hammersmith
Athletes from London
Medallists at the 1958 British Empire and Commonwealth Games